Gomantak Lok Pox (GLP; in English: Goa People's Party; in portuguese: Partido Popular de Goa) was a political party in the Indian state of Goa. The last general secretary of the party was Mathany Saldanha.

The GLP is the name given to a historical political grouping that was in struggle for the liberation of Portuguese India. The party, however, has three distinct historical moments: the first, which runs from 1835 to 1855; The second, from 1948 to 1962; The third from 1970 to 2002.

Between 1948 and 1961 he had George Vaz as secretary-general; Between 1961 and 1962 its representative in CONCP was Aquino de Bragança.

In the late 1970s, Mathany Saldanha established the "Gomantak Lok Pox" party.

In the state assembly elections 1999, Saldanha was the sole candidate of the party. Saldanha stood in the constituency Cortalim and got 1 728 votes (9.81%). In 2002, GLP merged with United Goans Democratic Party. Saldanha was the general secretary of UGDP.

References

External links
Matanhy Saldanha

Defunct political parties in Goa
1835 establishments in India
Political parties established in 1835
Political parties disestablished in 2002